Hovey Freeman (13 April 1932 – 29 November 1979) was a Puerto Rican sailor. He competed at the 1968 Summer Olympics, the 1972 Summer Olympics and the 1976 Summer Olympics. He was also bronce medallist at the 1965 Snipe World Championship.

References

External links
 

1932 births
1979 deaths
Puerto Rican male sailors (sport)
Olympic sailors of Puerto Rico
Sailors at the 1968 Summer Olympics – 5.5 Metre
Sailors at the 1972 Summer Olympics – Tempest
Sailors at the 1976 Summer Olympics – Tempest
Sportspeople from Providence, Rhode Island
Snipe class sailors
20th-century Puerto Rican people